"Mercy" is a song by American rock band Dave Matthews Band. Written by frontman Dave Matthews, it was released as the lead single from the band's eighth studio album Away from the World on July 16, 2012.

Release
Dave Matthews debuted "Mercy" solo on Late Night with Jimmy Fallon on April 24, 2012, and Dave Matthews Band released the studio version on July 16, 2012.

It was performed during Hand in Hand: A Benefit for Hurricane Relief by Matthews himself in 2017 and also during the March for Our Lives in Seattle, Washington in 2018.

Charts

Weekly charts

Year-end charts

References

2012 singles
Dave Matthews Band songs
Songs written by Dave Matthews
2012 songs